Beethoven is a 1992 American family comedy film, directed by Brian Levant and starring Charles Grodin and Bonnie Hunt as George and Alice Newton, respectively. It is the first installment of the Beethoven film series.

The film was written by John Hughes (under the pseudonym Edmond Dantès) and Amy Holden Jones. Its story centers on a St. Bernard dog named after the German composer of the same name and owned by the Newton family. It costars Nicholle Tom as Ryce Newton, Christopher Castile as Ted Newton, Sarah Rose Karr as Emily Newton, Stanley Tucci as Vernon, Oliver Platt as Harvey, and Dean Jones as Dr. Herman Varnick.

Plot
A group of puppies are stolen from a pet store by two thieves. A St. Bernard puppy escapes and sneaks into the Newton family's home. The workaholic father, George, does not want the responsibility of owning a dog, but his wife, Alice, and their children, Ryce, Ted, and Emily, convince him. They give him the name “Beethoven” when Emily plays a portion of Ludwig van Beethoven's Fifth Symphony on the piano and he barks along to it.

Beethoven grows into a fully grown, adult dog and helps Ryce, Ted, and Emily overcome their problems: he helps Ryce talk to a boy she has a crush on, scares off bullies for Ted, and saves Emily's life when she falls into an irresponsible babysitter's swimming pool. George, jealous of the affection Beethoven receives, feels neglected as his family fawns over him. His antics ruin a barbecue he is hosting for Brad and Brie Wilson, unpleasant venture capitalists looking to invest and swindle him out of his car air freshener firm.

The Newtons take Beethoven to a veterinarian named Dr. Herman Varnick for a routine medical examination and immunizations. They are unaware that he is involved in unethical and deadly animal experiments. He tells George of a supposed mental instability among St. Bernards making them potentially dangerous to humans and advises him to watch Beethoven closely for any sign of viciousness. He actually requires large-skulled dogs such as St. Bernards for an ammunition test.

Dr. Varnick visits the Newton home under the guise of doing a follow-up exam on Beethoven. He puts fake blood on his arm, cuts and tears his shirt sleeve, and hits Beethoven until he leaps on him. He pretends to be in agony, warning George that Beethoven may be turning aggressive and must be euthanized or he will have no choice but to press charges. Emily, who saw Dr. Varnick hit him, protests that the attack was fake, but George, fearing for his family's safety, reluctantly takes him to Dr. Varnick's office. It is on the way there that George discovers his own affections for him: he remembers his father had to take their dog to the vet to be euthanized and he never forgave him for it. He fears that his family will hate him now for taking Beethoven to be euthanized. When he returns home with the empty leash and collar, his family leaves the dinner table rather than remain with him, proving his fears true.

After being upset, the Newtons go to Dr. Varnick's office, but he tells them that Beethoven has already been euthanized. However, George remembers that Dr. Varnick's receptionist told him that Beethoven would not be euthanized until the next day. George then notices that Dr. Varnick has no bite marks on his arm and assaults him. The Newtons follow him to his warehouse. Beethoven breaks free but is recaptured by Dr. Varnick's two associates, Harvey and Vernon, while Alice calls the police. George crashes through the skylight just as Dr. Varnick prepares to shoot Beethoven. Before he can, however, a captive Jack Russell Terrier bites him in the crotch, causing him to fire a shot in the air. After hearing it, Ted drives the car through the door and runs it into a cart, launching numerous syringes into Dr. Varnick and sedating him. As the Newtons reunite with Beethoven and free all the captive dogs, they notice Harvey and Vernon trying to escape and send the dogs after them. They escape into a junkyard, only to be attacked by a pack of Dobermans guarding it.

Dr. Varnick, Harvey, and Vernon are arrested for animal abuse. The Newtons are praised as heroes by the news and George takes a new liking to Beethoven. Ryce also gets a phone call from her crush. The Newtons then go to sleep, saying good night to Beethoven and all of the dogs they rescued, who are sleeping in the master bedroom.

Cast
 Charles Grodin as George Newton
 Bonnie Hunt as Alice Newton
 Dean Jones as Dr. Herman Varnick
 Nicholle Tom as Ryce Newton
 Christopher Castile as Ted Newton
 Sarah Rose Karr as Emily Newton
 Oliver Platt as Harvey
 Stanley Tucci as Vernon
 David Duchovny as Brad Wilson
 Patricia Heaton as Brie Wilson
 Laurel Cronin as Devonia Peet
 Nancy Fish as Miss Grundel
 Joseph Gordon-Levitt as Student
 Richard Portnow as Ammo Gun Salesman

Production
The dogs featured in the film were owned and trained by Eleanor Keaton. Beethoven is played by canine actor Chris, who had 12 doubles. Principal photography began on May 1, 1991, in Los Angeles, California.

Reception

Critical response
Although the film received mixed reviews from critics, it received acclaim by audiences. On review aggregator Rotten Tomatoes, it has an approval rating of 29%, based on reviews from 28 critics, with an average score of 4.6/10. The critical consensus reads "Fluffy and incorrigible, Beethoven is a good boy who deserves a better movie." Audiences surveyed by CinemaScore gave Beethoven a grade A.

Roger Ebert of the Chicago Sun Times gave the film two-and-a-half stars out of four, writing in his review, "this is not the sort of entertainment I scour the movie pages for, hoping desperately for a new film about a cute dog. Nor did I find anything particularly new in "Beethoven", although I concede that the filmmakers secured an admirable dog for the title role, and that Charles Grodin, who is almost always amusing, has what fun can be had playing the grumpy dad."

Box office
The film grossed $57,114,049 in North America and $90,100,000 in other territories, for a total of $147.2 million worldwide.

Accolades

 Genesis Awards
In 1993, The Humane Society of the United States nominated Beethoven for Best Feature Film.

|-
| 1993
|
| Best Feature Film
| 
|-

 Young Artist Awards
In 1993, Sarah Rose Karr, Nicholle Tom, and Christopher Castile were nominated for their roles in Beethoven.

|-
|rowspan="4"| 1993
| Sarah Rose Karr
| Best Young Actress Under Ten in a Motion Picture
| 
|-
|
| Best Family Motion Picture
| 
|-
| Nicholle Tom
| Best Young Actress Starring in a Motion Picture
| 
|-
| Christopher Castile
| Best Young Actor Starring in a Motion Picture
| 
|-

Music
The soundtrack to the film was released on December 15, 1992.

Sequels and spin-offs

The film was followed by four sequels and three standalone movies using the Beethoven name and the premise of a St. Bernard but not mentioning previous characters such as the Newton family. Beethoven's 2nd was released to theaters in 1993. The remaining sequels were direct-to-video films: Beethoven's 3rd (2000), Beethoven's 4th (2001), Beethoven's 5th (2003), Beethoven's Big Break (2008), Beethoven's Christmas Adventure (2011), and Beethoven's Treasure Tail (2014). An animated TV series was also created around the films that debuted in 1994. Dean Jones voiced George Newton in it after playing Dr. Herman Varnick in the film and Nicholle Tom reprised her role, voicing Ryce Newton. None of the sequels or related media thereof featured the involvement of Hughes.

References

External links

 
 
 

1992 comedy films
1992 films
American children's comedy films
1990s English-language films
Films about animal cruelty
Films about dogs
Films about animals
Films about pets
Films adapted into television shows
Films directed by Brian Levant
Films produced by Michael C. Gross
Films with screenplays by John Hughes (filmmaker)
Mad scientist films
Universal Pictures films
Films scored by Randy Edelman
Beethoven (franchise)
Films with screenplays by Amy Holden Jones
1990s American films